Piotr A. Woźniak (born 1962) is a Polish researcher best known for his work on SuperMemo, a learning system based on spaced repetition.

Life
Woźniak was born in March 1962 in Milanówek, Poland.

He began to develop his spaced-repetition software after struggling to retain course material as a student at the Poznań University of Technology in the 1980s.

He received a doctorate from the Wrocław University of Economics in 1995. His doctoral dissertation was entitled Economics of Learning: New Aspects in Designing Modern Computer Aided Self-Instruction Systems.

In addition to the theory of spaced repetition, his research interests include incremental reading and the optimization of sleep.

He supports the idea of a single international auxiliary language, and for two years kept a diary in Esperanto.

Partial bibliography
 Woźniak, Piotr A., and Krzysztof Biedalak (1992). 'The SuperMemo Method: Optimization of Learning'. Informatyka, 10, .
 Woźniak, Piotr A., and Edward J. Gorzelanczyk (1994). 'Optimization of Repetition Spacing in the Practice of Learning'. Acta Neurobiologiae Experimentalis, 54, .

References

1962 births
20th-century psychologists
Living people
Polish academics
Polish Esperantists
Polish inventors
Polish psychologists
Wrocław University of Economics alumni